The Gay Deceivers is a 1969 American comedy film written by Jerome Wish and directed by Bruce Kessler. The film focuses on Danny Devlin (Kevin Coughlin) and Elliot Crane (Lawrence P. Casey), two straight men who attempt to evade the draft by pretending to be gay men.

According to gay film historian Vito Russo in his book The Celluloid Closet, co-star Michael Greer, who played the flamboyantly gay Malcolm and who was himself gay, tried to work with the screenwriter and director to minimize the negativity of the characterization and present Malcolm in a positive light.

Plot
The Gay Deceivers follows Danny and Elliot, two friends who try to get out of the draft by pretending to be gay. They are placed under surveillance by the Army and have to keep up the pretense. They move into a gay apartment building and try to blend in with the residents, all the while trying to maintain their romantic relationships with women and not get caught by the Army.

The twist is that even after the pair are caught, they are not inducted into the military. The Army investigators assigned to watch them are themselves gay and are trying to keep straight people out of the Army.

Cast
Kevin Coughlin - Danny Devlin
Brooke Bundy - Karen
Larry Casey - Elliot Crane
Jo Ann Harris - Leslie Devlin
Michael Greer - Malcolm
Sebastian Brook - Craig
Jack Starrett - Colonel Dixon
Richard Webb - Mr. Devlin
Eloise Hardt - Mrs. Devlin
Jeanne Baird - Mrs. Conway
Michael Kopcha - Psychiatrist
Joe Tornatore - Sergeant Kravits
Robert Reese - Real Estate Agent
Christopher Riordan - Duane
Douglas Hume - Corporal
David Osterhout - Stern
Marilyn Wirt - Sybil
Ron Gans - Freddie
Rachel Romen - Dorothy
Tom Grubbs - Paul
Louise Williams - Bunny
Randee Lynne Jensen - Sheryl
Meridith Williams - Phil
Harry Sodoni - Georgette
Leonore Stevens - Laverne
Trigg Kelly - Jacki
Tony Epper - Vince
Anthony De Longis - (uncredited)
Jonathan Kramer - Gay neighbor dating army officer (uncredited)
Candice Rialson - Girl in bikini (uncredited)

Production
It was the film debut of Candice Rialson.

Release
The film opened in Atlanta and San Francisco on July 2, 1969.

Home media
The Gay Deceivers was released on Region 1 DVD on May 2, 2000.

References

External links

1969 films
1969 comedy films
1969 LGBT-related films
American comedy films
American independent films
American LGBT-related films
Films set in Los Angeles
LGBT-related comedy films
Gay-related films
Films scored by Stu Phillips
Films directed by Bruce Kessler
1960s English-language films
1960s American films